Enzo Leijnse (born 16 July 2001 in Amsterdam) is a Dutch cyclist, who currently rides for UCI Continental team .

Major results

2018
 1st  Overall Grand Prix Rüebliland
1st Stage 3 (ITT)
 3rd Time trial, National Junior Road Championships
 6th Grand Prix Bob Jungels
 6th Overall Saarland Trofeo
2019
 UCI Junior Road World Championships
2nd  Time trial
4th Road race
 2nd Time trial, National Junior Road Championships
 UEC European Junior Road Championships
3rd  Time trial
4th Road race
 4th Overall Grand Prix Rüebliland
 6th Overall Tour du Pays de Vaud 
2020
 1st Stage 2b (TTT) Ronde de l'Isard
 7th Time trial, UEC European Under-23 Road Championships
2021
 1st Stage 2 (TTT) Tour de l'Avenir
 5th Time trial, National Under-23 Road Championships
2022
 1st Prologue (TTT) Tour de l'Avenir

References

External links

2001 births
Living people
Dutch male cyclists
Cyclists from Amsterdam